Josh Boyce (born May 6, 1991) is a former American football wide receiver. He was drafted by the New England Patriots in the fourth round of the 2013 NFL Draft. He played college football at TCU.

Early years
A native of Copperas Cove, Texas, Boyce attended Copperas Cove High School. He played high school football for the Copperas Cove Bulldawgs, with Robert Griffin III under center. He was named an honorable-mention all-state his senior year, after recording 42 receptions for 837 yards, and was instrumental in Copperas Cove's 13-2 season. He played for the A&T Bears in Copperas Cove, leading them to back to back championship games.

In addition to football, Boyce was also on the school's track & field team. He recorded a personal-best time of 11.47 seconds in the 100 meters, He was also a member of the 4 × 100 m (42.60) and 4 × 200 m (1:28.74) relay squads.

College career
Boyce attended Texas Christian University, where he played for the TCU Horned Frogs football team from 2009 to 2012.  During his college career, he started 33 of 39 games in which he appeared, and caught 161 passes for 2,535 receiving yards and 22 touchdowns.  In TCU's football history, he ranks second in touchdown receptions, third in receiving yards, and fourth in total receptions.

Professional career
He was drafted by the New England Patriots in the fourth round, with the 102nd overall pick, of the 2013 NFL Draft.

New England Patriots
Boyce was drafted with a toe injury and did not participate in the Patriots' rookies-only training camp in early May. On May 24, the Patriots signed Boyce to his rookie deal worth $2.367 million over four years.
Boyce only recorded nine receptions during his rookie year before being placed on injured reserve. He was waived by the Patriots on August 30, 2014 as part of final roster cuts, then signed to New England's practice squad the next day. After spending most of the 2014 season on the Patriots' practice squad, Boyce was called up from the practice squad on December 27 after Alfonzo Dennard was placed on season-ending injured reserve. Boyce was on the Patriots roster for their win over the Seattle Seahawks in Super Bowl XLIX but was inactive. On August 31, 2015 Boyce was waived by the Patriots and after clearing waivers was placed on the injury reserve list.

Indianapolis Colts
On April 7, 2016, Boyce signed with the Indianapolis Colts. Josh He was released on August 16, 2016 following the first preseason game.

Cleveland Browns
Boyce was signed by the Cleveland Browns on August 21, 2016. On August 29, 2016, he was waived by the Browns. On September 14, 2016, he was re-signed to the Browns' practice squad. He signed a reserve/future contract with the Browns on January 2, 2017. He was released on September 1, 2017 during roster cutdowns.

References

External links
TCU Horned Frogs bio

1991 births
Living people
American football wide receivers
TCU Horned Frogs football players
New England Patriots players
Indianapolis Colts players
Cleveland Browns players
People from Copperas Cove, Texas
Players of American football from Texas